A cross pattée, cross patty or cross paty, also known as a cross formy or cross formée, is a type of Christian cross with arms that are narrow at the centre, and often flared in a curve or straight line shape, to be broader at the perimeter. The form appears very early in medieval art, for example in a metalwork treasure binding given to Monza Cathedral by Queen Theodelinda (died 628), and the 8th-century lower cover of the Lindau Gospels in the Morgan Library. An early English example from the start of the age of heraldry proper (i.e. about 1200) is found in the arms of Baron Berkeley.

Etymology
The word pattée is a French adjective in the feminine form used in its full context as la croix pattée, meaning literally "footed cross", from the noun patte, meaning foot, generally that of an animal. The cross has four splayed feet, each akin to the foot, for example, of a chalice or candelabrum.  In German it is called Tatzenkreuz from Tatze, foot, paw. Planché provides a dubious suggestion that the term comes from the Latin verb pateo, to lie open, be spread. He states it to be discernible on the standard of King Stephen (1135–1154).

Variants
Several variants exist as follows:

Use in crowns

Many crowns worn by monarchs have jewelled crosses pattées mounted atop the band.  Most crowns possess at least four such crosses, from which the half arches rise. Some crowns are designed so that the half-arches can be detached, allowing the circlet to be worn separately on occasion.

A cross pattée is particularly associated with crowns in Christian countries. It is often heavily jewelled, with diamonds and precious stones. The Koh-i-Noor diamond is set in a cross pattée on the Crown of Queen Elizabeth. The British Imperial State Crown has a base of four crosses pattée alternating with four fleurs-de-lis. A cross pattée on the Imperial State Crown holds the Black Prince's Ruby. The cross pattée also features in many of the other British Crowns including the St Edward's Crown, used for coronations, and the Imperial Crown of India created for George V as Emperor of India to wear at the Delhi Durbar of 1911.

Use by Crusaders, Prussia and Germany

Teutonic Knights
This cross is often associated with the Crusades. The heraldic cross pattée was sometimes used by the Teutonic Knights, a Crusader order, though their more usual emblem was a plain straight black cross on white field..

Iron Cross

In 1813, King Frederick William III of Prussia established the Iron Cross as a decoration for military valor, and it remained in use, in various forms, by Prussia and later Germany until 1945. A stylized version of the Iron Cross is used to date by the German army (Bundeswehr) as its symbol of nationality, and is found on vehicles, aircraft and publications.

Prussian and Imperial German Landwehr and Landsturm troops used a Cross Pattée cap badge to distinguish them from regular army troops. A stylized version of the Cross Pattée is used by the modern German military (Bundeswehr) as its symbol of nationality, and is found on vehicles, aircraft and publications, with no border of any kind at the ends of each arm (as was the case with the Balkenkreuz used on German aircraft in 1918-1945).

Modern usage

Belarus
The cross pattée is adopted in several municipal coats of arms of Belarus.

Canada
The cross pattée, a traditional Royal symbol in Canada, has been incorporated into official national symbols, provincial symbols and the insignia of various national armed forces. The Arms of Canada, numerous provincial coat of arms and the badges of the Canadian Forces feature St Edward's Crown; that displays four cross pattée and four fleur-de-lys, supporting two dipped arches topped by a monde and another cross pattée. Numerous orders, decorations, and medals of Canada are designed with a cross pattée, including the nation's highest civilian honour, the Order of Merit and the Victoria Cross of Canada the highest military honour that is derived from that of the British original Victoria Cross.

France
The cross pattée can be found on coats of arms of various French communes.

Georgia

The Bolnisi cross is a cross symbol, taken from a 5th-century ornament at the Bolnisi Sioni church, which came to be used as one of the oldest national symbol of Georgia. It was used on the flags and coat of arms of the Kingdom of Georgia and the current Republic of Georgia, with its various organizations and administrative divisions.

Latvia

Montenegro

The Montenegrin cross-flag (Krstaš-barjak) has been used in Montenegro since medieval times to represent the state, and lately its military divisions. The earliest documented use of this flag has been recorded in 1687. During the 1990s, it was used as a symbol of Montenegrin independence movement, most notably by the Liberal Alliance of Montenegro. Nowadays, Montenegro's Royal Capital City Cetinje uses krstaš flag as its flag. It is also used as an unofficial alternate Montenegrin flag, as well as by local trademarks and societies related to Montenegro.

Poland

Portugal

The Portuguese heraldry makes a very common use of three variants of the cross pattée, the standard form (also as a variant of the Maltese cross proper, associated with the Knights Hospitaller), the Alisee form (associated with the Knights Templar) and the Order of Christ cross (associated with this order of chivalry and also used as one of main the National symbols of Portugal). These crosses are often present on the arms of the municipalities located in former domains of these orders.

Russia

Spain

Sweden
In Sweden, the term "Saint George's Cross" sometimes refers to the cross pattée used by Swedish Freemasons. For example, the cross of the Swedish Order of Freemasons was defined by the King of Sweden in 1928 to be a "red St George's cross with triangular arms".

Ukraine
In Ukraine, the "cossack cross" was used historically in banners by cossacks, installed on their graves, and nowadays part of emblems of a number of Ukrainian state bodies connected with security, including the Armed Forces of Ukraine.

Military

Volhynia

Eastern Podolia

Poltava (Myrhorod [Cossack] Cross)

United Kingdom

University of Durham

Other uses

The cross pattée is also placed before the name of the bishop who issues a Catholic imprimatur, and is occasionally found as a map symbol indicating the location of a Christian site.

It appears in the emblem of:
 The Victoria Cross
 The Distinguished Flying Cross (United States)
 The Bundeswehr Cross of Honour for Valour
 The Badge of Honour of the Bundeswehr
 The Order of St. George
The Order "For Merit to the Fatherland"
 The Order of Bohdan Khmelnytsky
 The Portuguese Football Federation
 F.C. Paços de Ferreira, a Portuguese football club
 C.F. Os Belenenses, a Lisboeta football club
 Casa Pia A.C., a Portuguese sports association
 Mira Mar SC, a Portuguese football club
 Flag of Asturias, a Spanish Principality
 Toulouse FC, a French football club
 The Sir Knight, Geneva Glen Camp's Highest rank in the orders
 The Knights of Columbus, designed in 1883, and called a "cross formée"
 Independent Truck Company, a manufacturer of skating equipment (in the alisée form, with the ends of the arms in the shape of arcs of an enclosing circle)
 The Crossmen Drum and Bugle Corps
 Schneider Cams, a speed equipment manufacturer
 Club de Regatas Vasco da Gama, a South African sports club
 Club de Regatas Vasco da Gama, a Brazilian sports club
 Neath RFC, a Welsh rugby club
 The Eaton House Group of Schools
 FC Volyn Lutsk, a Ukrainian football club
 Black Label Society, a heavy metal band
 Flag of the Hispanic People
 The Fifth Corps, a unit of the Union Army of the Potomac during the American Civil War from 1862–1865. 

Firefighters, especially in the United States, commonly use a version with triangular arms for patches and medals, though the cross pattée and the cross of St. Florian are both commonly mistaken for the Maltese cross. The cross pattée is used on the Marksmanship Badge in the United States Army, and United States Marine Corps.

Encoding
In Unicode, a Cross pattée character is encoded under the name  "Maltese Cross" in the Dingbats range at code point U+2720 (✠).

The character "X" is rendered as a cross pattée in the Microsoft Wingdings font.

See also
Crosses in heraldry

References

External links

Christian crosses
Pattee